Ernest Ray Miller (April 9, 1892 – March 31, 1987) was an American educator and coach of football, basketball, and baseball. He served as the head football coach at Defiance College in Defiance, Ohio from 1923 to 1924, Alfred University in Alfred, New York in 1925, Kentucky Wesleyan College from 1926 to 1927, Ohio Northern University from 1929 to 1930, and Western Kentucky State Teachers College (now known as Western Kentucky University) in 1932.

Miller attended Ohio University and graduated from Rio Grande College—now known as the University of Rio Grande—in Rio Grande, Ohio. In 1977, Miller earned a Doctor of Education degree from the University of Cincinnati at the age of 81. He died on March 31, 1987, at a hospital in Pompano Beach, Florida.

Head coaching record

College football

References

1892 births
1987 deaths
American school superintendents
Alfred Saxons football coaches
Defiance Yellow Jackets football coaches
Defiance Yellow Jackets men's basketball coaches
Defiance Yellow Jackets baseball coaches
Kentucky Wesleyan Panthers football coaches
Kentucky Wesleyan Panthers men's basketball coaches
Ohio Northern Polar Bears baseball coaches
Ohio Northern Polar Bears football coaches
Western Kentucky Hilltoppers football coaches
Wittenberg Tigers baseball coaches
Wittenberg Tigers football coaches
High school football coaches in Ohio
Ohio University alumni
University of Cincinnati alumni
University of Kentucky alumni
University of Rio Grande alumni
People from Ironton, Ohio
Coaches of American football from Ohio
Basketball coaches from Ohio
Baseball coaches from Ohio
Schoolteachers from Indiana
Schoolteachers from Ohio